Jesus Gonzalez may refer to:

Arts and Entertainment
 Jesús González Rubio (died 1874), Mexican music composer and educator
 Jesús González Alonso (born 1946), Spanish pianist
 J. F. Gonzalez (born 1964), American author of horror fiction

Politics
 Jesús González Ortega (1822-1882), Mexican military man and politician
 Jesús González Schmal (born 1942), Mexican lawyer and politician
 Jesús Gónzález Macías (born 1972), Mexican politician
 Jesus C. Gonzalez (born 1986), American gun rights advocate convicted of reckless homicide in a shooting

Sportspeople

Association football
 Jesús González (footballer, born 1969) (Jesús González Romero), Mexican football manager and former footballer
 Jesus Gonzalez (soccer, born 1991), Puerto Rican-American soccer player 
 Jesús González (footballer, born 1994) (Jesús González Díaz), Spanish footballer
 Jesús González (footballer, born 1998) (Jesús Eduardo González), Mexican footballer

Other sports
 Jesús González (basketball) (born 1986), Mexican basketball player
 Jesús González (boxer) (born 1984), American professional boxer
 Jesús González (Paralympian), Spanish parasport athlete
 Jesús González (rower, born 1959), Spanish Olympic rower
 Jesús González (rower, born 1974), Spanish Olympic rower
 Jesús González (runner), Spanish distance runner and competitor at the 1992 IAAF World Road Relay Championships
 Jesús González (swimmer) (born 1974), Mexican swimmer
 Jesús González (weightlifter) (born 1991), Venezuelan weightlifter
 Jesús González (diver) (born 2004), Venezuelan diver